The exhibition "New Painting of Common Objects" at the Pasadena Art Museum in 1962 was the first museum survey of American pop art. The eight artists included were: Roy Lichtenstein, Jim Dine, Andy Warhol, Phillip Hefferton, Robert Dowd, Edward Ruscha, Joe Goode and Wayne Thiebaud. It was curated by Walter Hopps, who had given Andy Warhol his first solo show at the Ferus Gallery in Los Angeles the previous year. The show helped the pop art movement gain critical acceptance, preceding the Guggenheim Museum's 1963 pop art exhibition "Six Painters and the Object", curated by Lawrence Alloway.

The artists
The artists came from different backgrounds. Thiebaud was a teacher at the University of California at Davis. Lichtenstein, Hefferton and Dowd had previously worked in the Abstract Expressionist style. Dine had been associated with Happenings in New York. Warhol had been a successful commercial artist. The youngest members of the group, old highschool friends Ruscha (24) and Goode (25), had recently left art school and were supporting themselves with graphic design work and odd jobs. In particular, Ruscha worked as a layout artist for the Carson-Roberts Advertising Agency in Los Angeles.

References

New Painting of Common Objects
New Painting of Common Objects
1962 in art
1962 in California
History of Pasadena, California